Lennart Mathiasen (born 11 April 1948) is a Danish sprint canoeist who competed in the early 1970s. He was eliminated in the repechages of the C-2 1000 m event at the 1972 Summer Olympics in Munich.

References
 Sports-reference.com profile

1948 births
Canoeists at the 1972 Summer Olympics
Danish male canoeists
Living people
Olympic canoeists of Denmark
Place of birth missing (living people)